Pedinomonas is a genus of green algae in the family Pedinomonadaceae.

The genus has also had species classified in Micromonas.

Species of Pedinomonas 
 Pedinomonas minor
 Pedinomonas tuberculata

References

External links

Chlorophyta genera
Pedinophyceae